Hematological and neurological expressed 1-like protein is a protein that in humans is encoded by the HN1L gene.

References

Further reading